Antonio Chocano (7 March 1913 – 16 May 2009) was a Guatemalan diplomat and fencer. He competed in the individual épée event at the 1952 Summer Olympics.

References

External links
 

1913 births
2009 deaths
Guatemalan diplomats
Guatemalan male épée fencers
Olympic fencers of Guatemala
Fencers at the 1952 Summer Olympics